Qwayshawn Cannon (born December 12, 2000), known professionally as B-Lovee, is an American rapper. Born in Maryland, he began his music career in 2015, pausing it until 2020, when he released his debut EP, Courtlandtbaby. He went viral after releasing "IYKYK" and "My Everything" in 2021, later appearing on songs with big rappers such as G Herbo, A Boogie wit da Hoodie and Digga D in 2022.

Early life
Qwayshawn was born to an Jamaican family; Born and raised primarily by his single mother in the Andrew Jackson houses of South Bronx, B-Lovee grew up in a community that was both challenging and formative. Reflecting on his upbringing, he has said,  In high school, he was nicknamed "Buddy Love" after a character in The Nutty Professor.

Qwayshawn grew up with fellow artists such as Kay Flock, Dougie B, and Sha EK in his youth days.

Career
In 2015, B-Lovee recorded a few songs before stopping due to a lack of motivation. He didn't record songs until the rise of Brooklyn drill in 2020, when he released his debut single, "No Hook". He released his debut EP, Courtlandtbaby, the same year.

In 2021, B-Lovee released "IYKYK", which was named by XXL as his biggest song. He also released "My Everything" after a leak of it went viral on TikTok; according to Lyrical Lemonade, "with 'My Everything', B Lovee pushed beyond New York and officially added a Bronx-born hit, through and through, to his resume.".

In 2022, B-Lovee released "What You Reckon" alongside Digga D; the song peaked at number 46 on the UK Singles Chart. An article from GRM Daily said that "What You Reckon" "leaves us anticipating what Noughty by Nature will offer when it arrives..." In April, he released Misunderstood, which included a feature from A Boogie Wit da Hoodie.

On January 11, 2023, B-Lovee's single "My Everything" was certified Gold by the RIAA, naming him the first Bronx drill rapper to receive an official RIAA certification.

Discography

EPs
Courtlandtbaby (2020)
My Everything (2021)
Misunderstood (2022)

Charted singles

Awards and nominations

References

21st-century American rappers
Living people
2000 births